

Events

Pre-1600
 350 – The Roman usurper Nepotianus, of the Constantinian dynasty, proclaims himself Roman emperor, entering Rome at the head of a group of gladiators.
 713 – The Byzantine emperor Philippicus is blinded, deposed and sent into exile by conspirators of the Opsikion army in Thrace. He is succeeded by Anastasios II, who begins the reorganization of the Byzantine army.
1098 – After a five-month siege during the First Crusade, the Crusaders seize Antioch (today's Turkey). 
1140 – The French scholar Peter Abelard is found guilty of heresy.
1326 – The Treaty of Novgorod delineates borders between Russia and Norway in Finnmark.
1539 – Hernando de Soto claims Florida for Spain.

1601–1900
1602 – An English naval force defeats a fleet of Spanish galleys, and captures a large Portuguese carrack at the Battle of Sesimbra Bay
1608 – Samuel de Champlain lands at Tadoussac, Quebec, in the course of his third voyage to New France, and begins erecting fortifications.
1621 – The Dutch West India Company receives a charter for New Netherland.
1658 – Pope Alexander VII appoints François de Laval vicar apostolic in New France.
1665 – James Stuart, Duke of York (later to become King James II of England), defeats the Dutch fleet off the coast of Lowestoft.
1781 – Jack Jouett begins his midnight ride to warn Thomas Jefferson and the Virginia legislature of an impending raid by Banastre Tarleton.
1839 – In Humen, China, Lin Tse-hsü destroys 1.2 million kilograms of opium confiscated from British merchants, providing Britain with a casus belli to open hostilities, resulting in the First Opium War.
1844 – The last pair of great auks is killed.
1861 – American Civil War: Battle of Philippi (also called the Philippi Races): Union forces rout Confederate troops in Barbour County, Virginia, now West Virginia.
1864 – American Civil War: Battle of Cold Harbor: Union forces attack Confederate troops in Hanover County, Virginia.
1866 – The Fenians are driven out of Fort Erie, Ontario back into the United States.
1885 – In the last military engagement fought on Canadian soil, the Cree leader, Big Bear, escapes the North-West Mounted Police.
1889 – The first long-distance electric power transmission line in the United States is completed, running  between a generator at Willamette Falls and downtown Portland, Oregon.

1901–present
1916 – The National Defense Act is signed into law, increasing the size of the United States National Guard by 450,000 men.
1935 – One thousand unemployed Canadian workers board freight cars in Vancouver, beginning a protest trek to Ottawa.
1937 – The Duke of Windsor marries Wallis Simpson.
1940 – World War II: The Luftwaffe bombs Paris.
  1940   – Franz Rademacher proposes plans to make Madagascar the "Jewish homeland", an idea that had first been considered by 19th century journalist Theodor Herzl.
1941 – World War II: The Wehrmacht razes the Greek village of Kandanos to the ground and murders 180 of its inhabitants.
1942 – World War II: Japan begins the Aleutian Islands Campaign by bombing Unalaska Island.
1943 – In Los Angeles, California, white U.S. Navy sailors and Marines attack Latino youths in the five-day Zoot Suit Riots.
1950 – Herzog and Lachenal of the French Annapurna expedition become the first climbers to reach the summit of an 8,000-metre peak.
1962 – At Paris Orly Airport, Air France Flight 007 overruns the runway and explodes when the crew attempts to abort takeoff, killing 130.
1963 – Soldiers of the South Vietnamese Army attack protesting Buddhists in Huế with liquid chemicals from tear-gas grenades, causing 67 people to be hospitalized for blistering of the skin and respiratory ailments.
1965 – The launch of Gemini 4, the first multi-day space mission by a NASA crew. Ed White, a crew member, performs the first American spacewalk.
1969 – Melbourne–Evans collision: off the coast of South Vietnam, the Australian aircraft carrier  cuts the U.S. Navy destroyer  in half; resulting in 74 deaths.
1973 – A Soviet supersonic Tupolev Tu-144 crashes near Goussainville, France, killing 14, the first crash of a supersonic passenger aircraft.
1979 – A blowout at the Ixtoc I oil well in the southern Gulf of Mexico causes at least  of oil to be spilled into the waters, the second-worst accidental oil spill ever recorded.
1980 – An explosive device is detonated at the Statue of Liberty. The FBI suspects Croatian nationalists.
  1980   – The 1980 Grand Island tornado outbreak hits Nebraska, causing five deaths and $300 million (equivalent to $ million in ) worth of damage.
1982 – The Israeli ambassador to the United Kingdom, Shlomo Argov, is shot on a London street; he survives but is left paralysed.
1984 – Operation Blue Star, a military offensive, is launched by the Indian government at Harmandir Sahib, also known as the Golden Temple, the holiest shrine for Sikhs, in Amritsar. The operation continues until June 6, with casualties, most of them civilians, in excess of 5,000.
1989 – The government of China sends troops to force protesters out of Tiananmen Square after seven weeks of occupation.
1991 – Mount Unzen erupts in Kyūshū, Japan, killing 43 people, all of them either researchers or journalists.
1992 – Aboriginal land rights are recognised in Australia, overturning the long-held colonial assumption of terra nullius, in Mabo v Queensland (No 2), a case brought by Torres Strait Islander Eddie Mabo and leading to the Native Title Act 1993.
1998 – After suffering a mechanical failure, a high speed train derails at Eschede, Germany, killing 101 people.
2006 – The union of Serbia and Montenegro comes to an end with Montenegro's formal declaration of independence.
2012 – A plane carrying 153 people on board crashes in a residential neighborhood in Lagos, Nigeria, killing everyone on board and six people on the ground.
  2012   – The pageant for the Diamond Jubilee of Elizabeth II takes place on the River Thames.
2013 – The trial of United States Army private Chelsea Manning for leaking classified material to WikiLeaks begins in Fort Meade, Maryland.
  2013   – At least 119 people are killed in a fire at a poultry farm in Jilin Province in northeastern China.
2015 – An explosion at a gasoline station in Accra, Ghana, kills more than 200 people.
2017 – London Bridge attack: Eight people are murdered and dozens of civilians are wounded by Islamist terrorists. Three of the attackers are shot dead by the police.
2019 – Khartoum massacre: In Sudan, over 100 people are killed when security forces accompanied by Janjaweed militiamen storm and open fire on a sit-in protest.

Births

Pre-1600
1139 – Conon of Naso, Basilian abbot (d. 1236)
1421 – Giovanni di Cosimo de' Medici, Italian noble (d. 1463)
1454 – Bogislaw X, Duke of Pomerania (1474–1523) (d. 1523)
1537 – João Manuel, Prince of Portugal (d. 1554)
1540 – Charles II, Archduke of Austria (d. 1590)
1554 – Pietro de' Medici, Italian noble (d. 1604)
1576 – Giovanni Diodati, Swiss-Italian minister, theologian, and academic (d. 1649)
1594 – César, Duke of Vendôme, French nobleman (d. 1665)

1601–1900
1603 – Pietro Paolini, Italian painter (d. 1681)
1635 – Philippe Quinault, French playwright and composer (d. 1688)
1636 – John Hale, American minister (d. 1700)
1659 – David Gregory, Scottish-English mathematician and astronomer (d. 1708)
1662 – Willem van Mieris, Dutch painter (d. 1747)
1723 – Giovanni Antonio Scopoli, Italian physician, geologist, and botanist (d. 1788)
1726 – James Hutton, Scottish geologist and physician (d. 1797)
1736 – Ignaz Fränzl, German violinist and composer (d. 1811)
1770 – Manuel Belgrano, Argentinian economist, lawyer, and politician (d. 1820)
1808 – Jefferson Davis, American colonel and politician, President of the Confederate States of America from 1861 - 1865 (d. 1889)
1818 – Louis Faidherbe, French general and politician, Governor of Senegal (d. 1889)
1819 – Anton Anderledy, Swiss religious leader, 23rd Superior General of the Society of Jesus (d. 1892)
  1819   – Johan Jongkind, Dutch painter (d. 1891)
1832 – Charles Lecocq, French pianist and composer (d. 1918)
1843 – Frederick VIII of Denmark (d. 1912)
1844 – Garret Hobart, American lawyer and politician, 24th Vice President of the United States (d. 1899)
  1844   – Detlev von Liliencron, German poet and author (d. 1909)
1852 – Theodore Robinson, American painter and academic (d. 1896)
1853 – Flinders Petrie, English archaeologist and academic (d. 1942)
1864 – Otto Erich Hartleben, German poet and playwright (d. 1905)
  1864   – Ransom E. Olds, American businessman, founded Oldsmobile and REO Motor Car Company (d. 1950)
1865 – George V of the United Kingdom (d. 1936)
1866 – George Howells Broadhurst, English-American director and manager (d. 1952)
1873 – Otto Loewi, German-American pharmacologist and psychobiologist, Nobel Prize laureate (d. 1961)
1877 – Raoul Dufy, French painter and illustrator (d. 1953)
1879 – Alla Nazimova, Ukrainian-American actress, producer, and screenwriter (d. 1945)
  1879   – Raymond Pearl, American biologist and botanist (d. 1940)
  1879   – Vivian Woodward, English footballer and soldier (d. 1954)
1881 – Mikhail Larionov, Russian painter and set designer (d. 1964)
1890 – Baburao Painter, Indian actor, director, producer, and screenwriter (d. 1954)
1897 – Memphis Minnie, American singer-songwriter (d. 1973)
1899 – Georg von Békésy, Hungarian-American biophysicist and academic, Nobel Prize laureate (d. 1972)
1900 – Adelaide Ames, American astronomer and academic (d. 1932) 
  1900   – Leo Picard, German-Israeli geologist and academic (d. 1997)

1901–present
1901 – Maurice Evans, English actor (d. 1989)
  1901   – Zhang Xueliang, Chinese general and warlord (d. 2001)
1903 – Eddie Acuff, American actor (d. 1956)
1904 – Charles R. Drew, American physician and surgeon (d. 1950)
  1904   – Jan Peerce, American tenor and actor (d. 1984)
1905 – Martin Gottfried Weiss, German SS officer (d. 1946)
1906 – R. G. D. Allen, English economist, mathematician, and statistician (d. 1983)
  1906   – Josephine Baker, French actress, singer, and dancer; French Resistance operative (d. 1975)
  1906   – Walter Robins, English cricketer and footballer (d. 1968)
1907 – Paul Rotha, English director and producer (d. 1984)
1910 – Paulette Goddard, American actress and model (d. 1990)
1911 – Ellen Corby, American actress and screenwriter (d. 1999)
1913 – Pedro Mir, Dominican poet and author (d. 2000)
1914 – Ignacio Ponseti, Spanish physician and orthopedist (d. 2009)
1917 – Leo Gorcey, American actor (d. 1969)
1918 – Patrick Cargill, English actor and producer (d. 1996)
  1918   – Lili St. Cyr, American burlesque dancer (d. 1999)
1921 – Forbes Carlile, Australian pentathlete and coach (d. 2016)
  1921   – Jean Dréjac, French singer and composer (d. 2003)
1922 – Alain Resnais, French director, cinematographer, and screenwriter (d. 2014)
1923 – Igor Shafarevich, Russian mathematician and theorist (d. 2017)
1924 – Karunanidhi, Indian screenwriter and politician, 3rd Chief Minister of Tamil Nadu (d. 2018)
  1924   – Colleen Dewhurst, Canadian-American actress (d. 1991)
  1924   – Jimmy Rogers, American singer and guitarist (d. 1997)
  1924   – Torsten Wiesel, Swedish neurophysiologist and academic, Nobel Prize laureate
1925 – Tony Curtis, American actor (d. 2010)
1926 – Allen Ginsberg, American poet (d. 1997)
  1926   – Flora MacDonald, Canadian banker and politician, 10th Canadian Minister of Communications (d. 2015)
1927 – Boots Randolph, American saxophonist and composer (d. 2007)
1928 – Donald Judd, American sculptor and painter (d. 1994)
  1928   – John Richard Reid, New Zealand cricketer (d. 2020)
1929 – Werner Arber, Swiss microbiologist and geneticist, Nobel Prize laureate
  1929   – Chuck Barris, American game show host and producer (d. 2017)
1930 – Marion Zimmer Bradley, American author and poet (d. 1999)
  1930   – George Fernandes, Indian journalist and politician, Minister of Defence for India (d. 2019)
  1930   – Dakota Staton, American singer (d. 2007)
  1930   – Abbas Zandi, Iranian wrestler (d. 2017)
  1930   – Ben Wada, Japanese director and producer (d. 2011)
  1930   – Joe Coulombe, founder of Trader Joe's (d. 2020)
1931 – Françoise Arnoul, Algerian-French actress (d. 2021)
  1931   – Raúl Castro, Cuban commander and politician, 18th President of Cuba
  1931   – John Norman, American philosopher and author
  1931   – Lindy Remigino, American runner and coach (d. 2018)
  1931   – Isa bin Salman Al Khalifa, Bahranian king (d. 1999)
1936 – Larry McMurtry, American novelist and screenwriter (d. 2021)
  1936   – Colin Meads, New Zealand rugby player and coach (d. 2017)
1937 – Jean-Pierre Jaussaud, French racing driver (d. 2021)
1939 – Frank Blevins, English-Australian lawyer and politician, 7th Deputy Premier of South Australia (d. 2013)
  1939   – Steve Dalkowski, American baseball player (d. 2020)
  1939   – Ian Hunter, English singer-songwriter and guitarist 
1942 – Curtis Mayfield, American singer-songwriter and producer (d. 1999)
1943 – Billy Cunningham, American basketball player and coach
1944 – Thomas Burns, British bishop
  1944   – Edith McGuire, American sprinter and educator
  1944   – Eddy Ottoz, Italian hurdler and coach
1945 – Hale Irwin, American golfer and architect
  1945   – Ramon Jacinto, Filipino singer, guitarist, and businessman, founded the Rajah Broadcasting Network
  1945   – Bill Paterson, Scottish actor 
1946 – Michael Clarke, American drummer (d. 1993)
  1946   – Eddie Holman, American pop/R&B/gospel singer
  1946   – Penelope Wilton, English actress
1948 – Jan Reker, Dutch footballer and manager
1950 – Frédéric François, Belgian-Italian singer-songwriter
  1950   – Melissa Mathison, American screenwriter and producer (d. 2015)
  1950   – Juan José Muñoz, Argentinian businessman (d. 2013)
  1950   – Larry Probst, American businessman
  1950   – Suzi Quatro, American-English singer-songwriter and guitarist 
  1950   – Christos Verelis, Greek politician, Greek Minister of Transport and Communications
  1950   – Deniece Williams, American singer-songwriter
1951 – Jill Biden, American educator, First Lady of the United States
1954 – Dan Hill, Canadian singer-songwriter
  1954   – Susan Landau, American mathematician and engineer
1956 – George Burley, Scottish footballer and manager
  1956   – Danny Wilde, American singer-songwriter and guitarist 
1957 – Horst-Ulrich Hänel, German field hockey player
1959 – Imbi Paju, Estonian-Finnish journalist and author
1960 – Catherine Davani, first female Papua New Guinean judge (d. 2016)
  1960   – Tracy Grimshaw, Australian television host
  1960   – Carl Rackemann, Australian cricketer and sportscaster
1961 – Lawrence Lessig, American lawyer, academic, and author, founded the Creative Commons
  1961   – Peter Vidmar, American gymnast
  1961   – Ed Wynne, English guitarist, songwriter, and producer 
1962 – Susannah Constantine, English fashion designer, journalist, and author 
  1962   – Dagmar Neubauer, German sprinter
1963 – Rudy Demotte, Belgian politician, 8th Minister-President of Wallonia
  1963   – Toshiaki Karasawa, Japanese actor
1964 – André Bellavance, Canadian politician
  1964   – Kerry King, American guitarist and songwriter 
  1964   – James Purefoy, English actor
1965 – Hans Kroes, Dutch swimmer
  1965   – Michael Moore, British accountant and politician, Secretary of State for Scotland
1966 – Wasim Akram, Pakistani cricketer, coach, and sportscaster
1967 – Anderson Cooper, American journalist and author
  1967   – Tamás Darnyi, Hungarian swimmer
1969 – Takako Minekawa, Japanese singer-songwriter
  1969   – Dean Pay, Australian rugby league player and coach
1971 – Luigi Di Biagio, Italian footballer and manager
  1971   – Mary Grigson, Australian cross-country mountain biker
1972 – Julie Gayet, French actress
1974 – Kelly Jones, Welsh singer-songwriter and guitarist 
  1974   – Serhii Rebrov, Ukrainian international footballer and manager 
1975 – Jose Molina, Puerto Rican-American baseball player
1976 – Nikos Chatzis, Greek basketball player
  1976   – Jamie McMurray, American race car driver
1977 – Cris, Brazilian footballer
1978 – Lyfe Jennings, American singer-songwriter and producer
1979 – Luis Fernando López, Colombian race walker
  1979   – Christian Malcolm, Welsh sprinter
1980 – Amauri, Brazilian-Italian footballer
1981 – Sosene Anesi, New Zealand rugby player
1982 – Yelena Isinbayeva, Russian pole vaulter
  1982   – Manfred Mölgg, Italian skier
1983 – Pasquale Foggia, Italian footballer
1985 – Papiss Cissé, Senegalese footballer
  1985   – Łukasz Piszczek, Polish footballer
1986 – Al Horford, Dominican basketball player
  1986   – Micah Kogo, Kenyan runner
  1986   – Rafael Nadal, Spanish tennis player
  1986   – Tomáš Verner, Czech ice skater
1987 – Masami Nagasawa, Japanese actress
1989 – Katie Hoff, American swimmer
1991 – Yordano Ventura, Dominican baseball player (d. 2017)
1992 – Mario Götze, German footballer
1998 – Hwang Eun-bi, South Korean singer and actress

Deaths

Pre-1600
 628 – Liang Shidu, Chinese rebel leader
 800 – Staurakios, Byzantine general
1052 – Prince Guaimar IV of Salerno
1397 – William de Montagu, 2nd Earl of Salisbury, English commander (b. 1328)
1411 – Leopold IV, Duke of Austria (b. 1371)
1453 – Loukas Notaras, last megas doux of the Byzantine Empire
1511 – Ahmad ibn Abi Jum'ah, Islamic scholar, author of the Oran fatwa
1548 – Juan de Zumárraga, Spanish-Mexican archbishop (b. 1468)
1553 – Wolf Huber, Austrian painter, printmaker and architect (b. 1485)
1594 – John Aylmer, English bishop and scholar (b. 1521)

1601–1900
1605 – Jan Zamoyski, Polish nobleman (b. 1542)
1615 – Sanada Yukimura, Japanese samurai (b. 1567)
1640 – Theophilus Howard, 2nd Earl of Suffolk, English politician, Lord Warden of the Cinque Ports (b. 1584)
1649 – Manuel de Faria e Sousa, Portuguese historian and poet (b. 1590)
1657 – William Harvey, English physician and academic (b. 1578)
1659 – Morgan Llwyd, Welsh minister and poet (b. 1619)
1665 – Charles Weston, 3rd Earl of Portland, English noble (b. 1639)
1780 – Thomas Hutchinson, American businessman and politician, Governor of the Province of Massachusetts Bay (b. 1711)
1826 – Nikolay Karamzin, Russian historian and poet (b. 1766)
1858 – Julius Reubke, German pianist and composer (b. 1834)
1861 – Stephen A. Douglas, American lawyer and politician, 7th Secretary of State of Illinois (b. 1813)
1865 – Okada Izō, Japanese samurai (b. 1838)
1875 – Georges Bizet, French pianist and composer (b. 1838)
1877 – Ludwig Ritter von Köchel, Austrian botanist, composer, and publisher (b. 1800)
1882 – Christian Wilberg, German painter and illustrator (b. 1839)
1894 – Karl Eduard Zachariae von Lingenthal, German lawyer and jurist (b. 1812)
1899 – Johann Strauss II, Austrian composer and educator (b. 1825)
1900 – Mary Kingsley, English explorer and author (b. 1862)

1901–present
1902 – Vital-Justin Grandin, French-Canadian bishop and missionary (b. 1829)
1906 – John Maxwell, American golfer (b. 1871)
1921 – Coenraad Hiebendaal, Dutch rower and physician (b. 1879)
1924 – Franz Kafka, Czech-Austrian lawyer and author (b. 1883)
1928 – Li Yuanhong, Chinese general and politician, 2nd President of the Republic of China (b. 1864)
1933 – William Muldoon, American wrestler (b. 1852)
1938 – John Flanagan, Irish-American hammer thrower and tug of war competitor (b. 1873) 
1946 – Mikhail Kalinin, Russian civil servant and politician (b. 1875)
1963 – Edmond Decottignies, French weightlifter (b. 1893)
  1963   – Pope John XXIII (b. 1881)
  1963   – Nâzım Hikmet, Turkish poet, author, and playwright (b. 1902)
1964 – Kâzım Orbay, Turkish general and politician, 9th Turkish Speaker of the Parliament (b. 1887)
  1964   – Frans Eemil Sillanpää, Finnish author and academic, Nobel Prize laureate (b. 1888)
1969 – George Edwin Cooke, American soccer player (b. 1883)
1970 – Hjalmar Schacht, Danish-German economist, banker, and politician (b. 1877)
1971 – Heinz Hopf, German-Swiss mathematician and academic (b. 1894)
1973 – Jean Batmale, French footballer and manager (b. 1895)
  1974   – Michael Gaughan (Irish republican), Irish Republican hunger striker (b. 1949)
1975 – Ozzie Nelson, American actor and bandleader (b. 1906)
  1975   – Eisaku Satō, Japanese and politician, Prime Minister of Japan (b. 1901)
1977 – Archibald Hill, English physiologist and politician, Nobel Prize laureate (b. 1886)
  1977   – Roberto Rossellini, Italian director and screenwriter (b. 1906)
1981 – Carleton S. Coon, American anthropologist and academic (b. 1904)
1986 – Anna Neagle, English actress and singer (b. 1904)
1987 – Will Sampson, American actor and painter (b. 1933)
1989 – Ruhollah Khomeini, Iranian religious leader and politician, 1st Supreme Leader of Iran (b. 1902)
1990 – Robert Noyce, American physicist and businessman, co-founded the Intel Corporation (b. 1927)
1991 – Brian Bevan, Australian rugby league player (b. 1924)
  1991   – Katia Krafft, French volcanologist and geologist (b. 1942)
  1991   – Maurice Krafft, French volcanologist and geologist (b. 1946)
  1991   – Lê Văn Thiêm, Vietnamese mathematician and academic (b. 1918)
1992 – Robert Morley, English actor and screenwriter (b. 1908)
1993 – Yeoh Ghim Seng, Singaporean politician, acting President of Singapore (b. 1918)
1994 – Puig Aubert, German-French rugby player and coach (b. 1925)
1997 – Dennis James, American actor and game show host (b. 1917)
2001 – Anthony Quinn, Mexican-American actor and producer (b. 1915)
2002 – Lew Wasserman, American talent agent and manager (b. 1913)
2003 – Felix de Weldon, Austrian-American sculptor, designed the Marine Corps War Memorial (b. 1907)
2005 – Harold Cardinal, Canadian lawyer and politician (b. 1945)
2009 – David Carradine, American actor (b. 1936)
  2009   – Koko Taylor, American singer (b. 1928)
2010 – Rue McClanahan, American actress (b. 1934)
2011 – James Arness, American actor and producer (b. 1923)
  2011   – Andrew Gold, American singer, songwriter, musician and arranger (b. 1951)
  2011   – Bhajan Lal, Indian politician, 6th Chief Minister of Haryana (b. 1930)
  2011   – Jack Kevorkian, American pathologist, author, and activist (b. 1928)
  2011   – Jan van Roessel, Dutch footballer (b. 1925)
2012 – Carol Ann Abrams, American producer, author, and academic (b. 1942)
  2012   – Roy Salvadori, English racing driver and manager (b. 1922)
  2012   – Brian Talboys, New Zealand journalist and politician, 7th Deputy Prime Minister of New Zealand (b. 1921)
2013 – Atul Chitnis, German-Indian technologist and journalist (b. 1962)
  2013   – Józef Czyrek, Polish economist and politician, Polish Minister of Foreign Affairs (b. 1928)
  2013   – Frank Lautenberg, American soldier and politician (b. 1924)
2014 – Svyatoslav Belza, Russian journalist, author, and critic (b. 1942)
  2014   – Gopinath Munde, Indian politician, 3rd Deputy Chief Minister of Maharashtra (b. 1949)
2015 – Avi Beker, Israeli political scientist and academic (b. 1951)
2016 – Muhammad Ali, American boxer (b. 1942)
2021 – F. Lee Bailey, American attorney (b. 1933)

Holidays and observances
 Roman Empire: Festival for the goddess Bellona.
 Christian feast day:
 Charles Lwanga and Companions (Roman Catholic Church), and its related observances:
 Martyrs' Day (Uganda) 
 Clotilde
 Kevin of Glendalough
 Ovidius
 Vladimirskaya (Russian Orthodox)
 June 3 (Eastern Orthodox liturgics)
 Confederate Memorial Day (Kentucky, Louisiana, and Tennessee, United States)
 Economist day (Buenos Aires, Argentina)
 Mabo Day (Australia)
 Opium Suppression Movement Day (Taiwan)
 World Bicycle Day

References

External links

 
 
 

Days of the year
June